The European People's Party Group (EPP Group) is a centre-right political group of the European Parliament consisting of deputies (MEPs) from the member parties of the European People's Party (EPP). Sometimes it also includes independent MEPs and/or deputies from unaffiliated national parties. The EPP Group comprises politicians of Christian-democratic, conservative and liberal-conservative orientation.

The European People's Party was officially founded as a European political party in 1976. However, the European People's Party Group in the European Parliament has existed in one form or another since June 1953, from the Common Assembly of the European Coal and Steel Community, making it one of the oldest European-level political groups. It has been the largest political group in the European Parliament since 1999.

History
The Common Assembly of the European Coal and Steel Community (the predecessor of the present day European Parliament) first met on 10 September 1952 and the first Christian Democratic Group was unofficially formed the next day, with Maan Sassen as president. The group held 38 of the 78 seats, two short of an absolute majority. On 16 June 1953 the Common Assembly passed a resolution enabling the official formation of political groups, and on 23 June 1953 the constituent declaration of the group was published and the group was officially formed.

The Christian Democrat group was the biggest group at formation, but as time wore on, it lost support and was the second-biggest group by the time of the 1979 elections. As the European Community expanded into the European Union, the dominant centre-right parties in the new member states were not necessarily Christian democratic, and the EPP (European People's Party, the pan-continental political party founded in 1976, to which all group members are now affiliated) feared being sidelined. To counter this, the EPP expanded its remit to cover the centre-right regardless of tradition and pursued a policy of integrating liberal-conservative parties.

This policy led to Greek New Democracy and Spanish People's Party MEPs joining the EPP Group. The British Conservative Party and Danish Conservative People's Party tried to maintain a group of their own, named the European Democrats (ED), but lack of support and the problems inherent in maintaining a small group forced ED's collapse in the 1990s, and its members crossed the floor to join the EPP Group. The parties of these MEPs also became full members of the EPP (with the exception of the British Conservative Party, which did not join) and this consolidation process of the European centre-right continued during the 1990s with the acquisition of members from the Italian party Forza Italia. However, the consolidation was not unalloyed and a split emerged with the Eurosceptic MEPs who congregated in a subgroup within the Group, also called the European Democrats (ED).

Nevertheless, the consolidation held through the 1990s, assisted by the group being renamed the European People's Party – European Democrats (EPP-ED) Group, and after the 1999 European elections the EPP-ED reclaimed its position as the largest group in the Parliament from the Party of European Socialists (PES) Group.

Size was not enough, however: the group did not have a majority. It continued therefore to engage in the Grand Coalition (a coalition with the PES Group, or occasionally the Liberals) to generate the majorities required by the cooperation procedure under the Single European Act.

Meanwhile, the parties in the European Democrats subgroup were growing restless, with the establishment in July 2006 of the Movement for European Reform, and finally left following the 2009 elections, when the Czech Civic Democratic Party and British Conservative Party formed their own right-wing European Conservatives and Reformists (ECR) group on 22 June 2009, abolishing the European Democrats subgroup from that date. The EPP-ED Group reverted to its original name – the EPP Group – immediately.

In the 7th European Parliament the EPP Group remained the largest parliamentary group with 275 MEPs. It is currently the only political group in the European parliament to fully represent its corresponding European political party, i.e. the European People's Party. The United Kingdom was the only member state to not be represented in the group; this state of affairs ceased temporarily on 28 February 2018, when two MEPs suspended from the British Conservative Party left the ECR group and joined the EPP. The two MEPs later joined a breakaway political party in the UK, The Independent Group.

After twelve member parties in the EPP called for Hungary's Fidesz's expulsion or suspension, Fidesz's membership was suspended with a common agreement on 20 March 2019. The suspension was applied only to the EPP but not to its group in the Parliament. On 3 March 2021, Fidesz decided to leave the EPP group, after the group's new rules, however still kept their membership in the party. On 18 March 2021, Fidesz decided to leave the European People's Party.

In the 9th European Parliament the EPP won 182 seats out of a total of 751. They formed a coalition with Progressive Alliance of Socialists and Democrats and Renew Europe to elect Ursula von der Leyen as president of the European Commission.

Membership at formation
The 38 members in the group on 11 September 1952 were as follows:

Structure

Organisation
The EPP Group is governed by a collective (referred to as the Presidency) that allocates tasks. The Presidency consists of the Group Chair and a maximum of ten Vice-Chairs, including the Treasurer. The day-to-day running of the EPP Group is performed by its secretariat in the European Parliament, led by its Secretary-General. The Group runs its own think-tank, the European Ideas Network, which brings together opinion-formers from across Europe to discuss issues facing the European Union from a centre-right perspective.

The EPP Group Presidency includes:

The chairs of the group and its predecessors from 1952 to 2020 are as follows:

Membership

9th European Parliament

Former members

7th and 8th European Parliament

Activities

In the news
Activities performed by the group in the period between June 2004 and June 2008 include monitoring elections in Palestine and Ukraine; encouraging transeuropean rail travel, telecoms deregulation, energy security, a common energy policy, the accession of Bulgaria and Romania to the Union, partial reform of the CAP and attempts to tackle illegal immigration; denouncing Russian involvement in South Ossetia; supporting the Constitution Treaty and the Lisbon Treaty; debating globalisation, relations with China, and Taiwan; backing plans to outlaw Holocaust denial; nominating Anna Politkovskaya for the 2007 Sakharov Prize; expelling Daniel Hannan from the Group; the discussion about whether ED MEPs should remain within EPP-ED or form a group of their own; criticisms of the group's approach to tackling low turnout for the 2009 elections; the group's use of the two-President arrangement; and the group's proposal to ban the Islamic Burka dress across the EU.

Parliamentary activity profile

The debates and votes in the European Parliament are tracked by its website and categorised by the groups that participate in them and the rule of procedure that they fall into. The results give a profile for each group by category and the total indicates the group's level of participation in Parliamentary debates. The activity profile for each group for the period 1 August 2004 to 1 August 2008 in the Sixth Parliament is given on the diagram on the right. The group is denoted in blue.

The website shows the group as participating in 659 motions, making it the third most active group during the period.

Publications
The group produces many publications, which can be found on its website. Documents produced in 2008 cover subjects such as dialogue with the Orthodox Church, study days, its strategy for 2008–09, Euro-Mediterranean relations, and the Lisbon Treaty. It also publishes a yearbook and irregularly publishes a presentation, a two-page summary of the group.

Academic analysis
The group has been characterised as a three-quarters-male group that, prior to ED's departure, was only 80% cohesive and split between centre-right Europhiles (the larger EPP subgroup) and right-wing Eurosceptics (the smaller ED subgroup). The group as a whole is described as ambiguous on hypothetical EU taxes, against taxation, Green issues, social liberal issues (LGBT rights, abortion, euthanasia) and full Turkish accession to the European Union, and for a deeper Federal Europe, deregulation, the Common Foreign and Security Policy and controlling migration into the EU.

See also

 European People's Party
 Members of the European Parliament 2019-2024

References

External links
EPP Group in the European Parliament
European People's Party (EPP)

European People's Party
European People's Party–European Democrats
European Parliament party groups
Political parties established in 1953
Political parties established in 1976
1953 establishments in Europe
1976 establishments in Europe